A municipal election was held in Gatineau, Quebec, Canada on November 7, 2021, in conjunction with the 2021 Quebec municipal elections held on the same day. Elections will be held for Mayor of Gatineau as well as for each of the 19 districts on Gatineau City Council.

Mayor Maxime Pedneaud-Jobin announced he would not be running for re-election.

City council will expand by one seat, with the creation of the Mitigomijokan District out of parts of the Plateau and Deschênes Districts.

Mayoral race

Opinion polls

Aylmer District

Lucerne District

Deschênes District

Plateau District

Mitigomijokan District

Manoir-des-Trembles-Val-Tétreau District

Hull-Wright District

Parc-de-la-Montagne-Saint-Raymond District

Orée-du-Parc District

Limbour District

Touraine District

Pointe-Gatineau District

Carrefour-de-l'Hôpital District

Versant District

Bellevue District

Lac-Beauchamp District

Rivière-Blanche District

Masson-Angers District

Buckingham District

References

External links
Candidates

2021 Quebec municipal elections
2021